National Highway 70, commonly referred to as NH 70 is a primary national highway in India. NH-70 traverses the state of Rajasthan in India. It is part of Bharatmala pariyojana.

Route 
NH25 near Munabao, Sundra, Myajlar, Dhanana, Asutar, Ghotaru, Longewala, NH68 near Tanot.

Junctions  

  Terminal near Munabao.
  Terminal near Tanot.

See also 

 List of National Highways in India
 List of National Highways in India by state

References

External links 

 NH 70 on OpenStreetMap

National highways in India
National Highways in Rajasthan